Jason Pierce is a Canadian drummer, currently the drummer of the Canadian band Our Lady Peace since 2016.

Career
During the 2000s, Pierce was a member of the Canadian band The Weekend.

In 2012, Pierce performed drums on the Evans Blue album Graveyard of Empires. He was also the drummer for Treble Charger for a time.

In 2014, while in search of a replacement drummer, Our Lady Peace enlisted Pierce to perform during live shows. In 2016, he officially joined the band as their full-time drummer.

He has also toured with Carly Rae Jepsen, Justin Bieber, Paramore, Dallas Green, and Chantal Kreviazuk, among others.

References

External links
 Official website

Living people
Canadian rock drummers
Our Lady Peace members
Alternative rock drummers
20th-century Canadian drummers
21st-century Canadian drummers
Musicians from London, Ontario
Year of birth missing (living people)